Nash Stream Forest is a nearly  protected area in northern New Hampshire in the United States. The state-owned property is located south of Dixville Notch in the towns of Stark, Stratford, and Columbia, and in Odell township. The forest occupies land on either side of Nash Stream, a south-flowing tributary of the Upper Ammonoosuc River and part of the Connecticut River watershed. The forest is bordered to the south by Christine Lake and Kauffmann Forest.

References

Landforms of Coös County, New Hampshire
New Hampshire state forests